The Philippine oriole (Oriolus steerii) or grey-throated oriole is a species of bird in the family Oriolidae.
It is endemic to the Philippines.

Its natural habitat is subtropical or tropical moist lowland forests. The species is fairly common throughout its range, but the Cebu race (O. s. assimilis) was last sighted in 1906 and is now classified as extinct.

Taxonomy and systematics
First described by Richard Bowdler Sharpe in 1877, the Philippine oriole is a member of the genus Oriolus.  Some authorities have considered it to be conspecific with, or as a subspecies of, the dark-throated oriole. These two species may form a superspecies with the Isabela oriole.

Subspecies
Five subspecies are recognized: 
 O. s. samarensis - Steere, 1890: Found on Samar, Leyte, Bohol and eastern Mindanao
 †Cebu dark-throated oriole (O. s. assimilis) - Tweeddale, 1878: Originally described as a separate species. Formerly found on Cebu
 O. s. steerii - Sharpe, 1877: Found on Masbate and Negros
 O. s. basilanicus - Ogilvie-Grant, 1896: Found on Basilan and western Mindanao
 O. s. cinereogenys - Bourns & Worcester, 1894: Found in the Sulu Archipelago.

Description
The Philippine oriole is a yellowish-brown bird with mainly thin feathers on the upper side of its body, a red beak and red eyes as well.

Distribution and habitat
Endemic to the Philippines, the Philippine oriole is found in forest, forest edge and second growth in the lowlands of Masbate, Samar, Leyte, Semirara Island, Negros, Bohol, Mindanao, Basilan and the Sulu Archipelago.

Behaviour and ecology
This species, as much like with other orioles, tend to have a diet of mainly grass, flowers and similar food.

References

Philippine oriole
Endemic birds of the Philippines
Philippine oriole
Taxonomy articles created by Polbot